The final of the Women's Triple Jump event at the 1994 European Championships in Helsinki, Finland was held on Thursday August 20, 1994. There were a total number of 26 participating athletes including one non-starter, with two qualifying groups. The top twelve and ties, and all those reaching 14.20 metres advanced to the final. The qualification round was held in Wednesday August 19, 1994. The event was included for the first time at the European Athletics Championships.

Medalists

Abbreviations
All results shown are in metres

Results

Final
8 August

†: Sofiya Bozhanova ranked initially 4th (14.58m (w: +1.1 m/s)), but was tested positive for amphetamine and disqualified for infringement of IAAF doping rules.

Qualification
7 August

Group A

Group B

†: Sofiya Bozhanova initially reached the final (14.08m (w: -1.7 m/s)), but was disqualified later for infringement of IAAF doping rules.

Participation
According to an unofficial count, 25 athletes from 14 countries participated in the event.

 (2)
 (2)
 (1)
 (1)
 (3)
 (2)
 (3)
 (1)
 (1)
 (1)
 (3)
 (1)
 (1)
 (3)

See also
 1993 Women's World Championships Triple Jump (Stuttgart)
 1995 Women's World Championships Triple Jump (Gothenburg)
 1996 Women's Olympic Triple Jump (Atlanta)
 1997 Women's World Championships Triple Jump (Athens)

References

 Results
 todor66

Triple jump
Triple jump at the European Athletics Championships
1994 in women's athletics